Steve Byrne (born July 21, 1974) is an American stand-up comedian and actor. He is best known from his multiple stand up comedy hour specials, creating, writing and starring in Sullivan & Son and as the writer/director of the feature film The Opening Act.

Early life and education
Byrne was born in Freehold, New Jersey. Byrne grew up in Pittsburgh, Pennsylvania, and went to Hampton High School. He graduated from Kent State University in Kent, Ohio. His mother is Korean and his father is of Irish descent. Steve has a younger brother, William.

He studied theatre at Kent State University.

Career
Byrne was exposed to stand up comedy by working at the comedy club Caroline's in New York City. The first time he ever got on stage was at Stand Up New York on September 30, 1997.

Byrne spent the early part of 2018 directing a documentary about Las Vegas headliner, magician and comedian The Amazing Johnathan, entitled Always Amazin'''. The documentary won best documentary film at the Sydney Lift Off Festival, Special Mention at Los Angeles Lift Off Festival, and was screened at Hollywood Now Festival, All Things Comedy Festival and Vancouver Just for Laughs Film Festival. Always Amazing was released in 2019 for free on YouTube.

From 2017–2018, Byrne had been writing a script while on the road about his early years in stand up comedy. That film eventually got the green light, and Byrne wrote and directed his first feature film, The Opening Act, starring Jimmy O Yang, Alex Moffat and Cedric the Entertainer. The film was released October 16, 2020.

In 2003, he filmed the documentary film 13 or Bust, where he did 13 shows in one night at every comedy club in Manhattan, breaking the record for most sets in one night by a comedian. It is available on iTunes as a podcast for free.

In 2006 Comedy Central aired Byrne's first half-hour special, Comedy Central Presents Steve Byrne. Byrne had a one-hour special on Comedy Central in 2008 titled Steve Byrne's Happy Hour. On Sunday, July 25, 2010, he had another one-hour special on Comedy Central titled The Byrne Identity. Byrne was also featured on the NBC series The Real Wedding Crashers and a featured comedian on The Tonight Show appearing ten times. He has made appearances on Chappelle's Show, Tough Crowd with Colin Quinn, @midnight, The History Channel's "History of the Joke," Mad TV's 300th episode and Super Bowl promos on CBS with Prince and again with Bill Cowher. His stand-up has been featured on The Late Late Show, Jimmy Kimmel Live!, Last Call with Carson Daly, BET's ComicView, ABC's Good Morning America as well as Comedy Central's Premium Blend. He has been a featured comic in The Just For Laughs Festival in Montreal, the HBO US Comedy Arts Festival in Las Vegas the TBS Very Funny Festival in Chicago, the TBS Very Funny Festival in Toronto and The CanWest Comedy Fest in Vancouver. He has appeared on the Showtime comedy series Live Nude Comedy and shot a pilot for the G4 Network based on a Japanese Game Show called Drunken Businessman.

His Comedy Central Presents Half Hour Special premiered in 2006 and was voted the seventeenth-most-popular Comedy Central Presents by fans as part of the Standup Showdown on comedycentral.com. He also was the winner of the MySpace Standup Or Sitdown competition on TBS. He has had small parts in several films: The Goods: Live Hard, Sell Hard, starring Jeremy Piven and produced by Will Ferrell; Four Christmases, starring Vince Vaughn and Reese Witherspoon; and Couples Retreat, starring Vince Vaughn and Jon Favreau. On July 16, he appeared on Conan. He became a regular on The Tonight Show with Jay Leno and has done it 9 times. He filmed his third hour special Feb. 8th in New York City in 2014 called Champion and it's currently streaming on Netflix. He's currently touring and working on the material for his fourth hour special, which will be entitled, Tell the Damn Joke.Byrne wrote and created with Rob Long the comedy Sullivan & Son on TBS that premiered in the summer of 2012. After a very successful summer run with Season One, TBS gave the go ahead for a second season that aired in summer of 2013. The show proved to be a hit with an average of 2.4 million viewers per episode and was brought back for a third season with 13 episodes slated for summer of 2014. The show averaged 2 million viewers. Byrne once again hit the road with the other comedians and co-stars of the show Owen Benjamin, Ahmed Ahmed and Roy Wood Jr. in support of Sullivan & Son in 2015. He did a show for Comedy Central and the troops at Ft. Irwin in 2006.   Byrne embarked on his own USO tour of Afghanistan in June 2008, Japan and Guam in July 2009 and Afghanistan again in 2010. He went back on a USO tour with the other comedians from Sullivan and Son to thank the troops in 2013. He has been part of several national comedy tours including The Jameson Comedy Tour, Vince Vaughn's Wild West Comedy Tour, and The Camel Cigarettes Sin City Tour, and his own national MySpace tour. He has opened for musical acts Kanye West, Mariah Carey on her Charmbracelet Tour, Modest Mouse, Puddle of Mudd, Spoon, Rev. Horton Heat, Kings of Leon and many more. Byrne has toured with The Kims of Comedy with Bobby Lee of Mad TV and Ken Jeong of NBC's Community and The Hangover. In early 2011, he toured nationwide on The Comedy Road Show with Vince Vaughn and Kevin James to promote the film The Dilemma''. In the summer of 2011, he toured on The New Majority Tour with Lisa Lampanelli, Gabriel Iglesias and Russell Peters. Since 2005, Byrne has been headlining comedy clubs across the country. He is currently touring to prepare for his fourth one-hour special.

In October 2017, Byrne was the supporting act for The Tenderloins in their "Impractical Jokers: Where's Larry? Tour".

Personal life
Byrne is married and has two children. In 2020 Byrne and his family moved from Los Angeles to Nashville.

References

External links
Official website
 at Facebook
Steve Byrne at MySpace
 at Twitter
Pittsburgh PG article
Steve Byrne funny podcast interview on The Gentlemen's Club with Caleb Bacon
Levity Entertainment Group
Steve Byrne Interview June 2008
Steve Byrne interview with AsiaXpress.com
Steve Byrne interview with SanDiego.com

1974 births
American stand-up comedians
Living people
American people of Irish descent
American male actors of Korean descent
Male actors from Pittsburgh
Kent State University alumni
21st-century American comedians